Franca is a feminine given name which may refer to:

 Franca Afegbua, Nigerian politician, first elected woman senator in Nigeria (in 1983)
 Franca Arena (born 1937), Australian politician and activist
 Franca Bettoia (born 1936), Italian actress
 Franca Bianconi (born 1962), Italian figure skating coach and former competitor
 Franca Faldini (1931–2016), Italian writer, journalist and actress
 Franca Florio (1873–1950), Italian noblewoman and socialite
 Franca Helg (1920–1989), Italian designer and architect
 Franca Masu (born 1962), Italian singer and songwriter
 Franca Mattiucci (born 1938), Italian retired operatic mezzo-soprano
 Franca Parisi (born 1933), Italian actress
 Franca Rame (1929–2013), Italian theatre actress, playwright and political activist
 Franca Scagnetti (1924–1999), Italian film actress
 Franca Sozzani (1950–2016), Italian journalist and longtime editor-in-chief of Vogue Italia
 Franca Squarciapino (born 1940), Italian Oscar-winning costume designer
 Franca Treur (born 1979), Dutch writer and freelance journalist
 Franca Viola (born 1948), Italian woman who became famous in the 1960s in Italy for refusing to marry her rapist
 Franca Visalta (1170–1218), also known as Franca of Piacenza, Catholic saint and Cistercian abbess

Italian feminine given names